Munchkins are characters in the book The Wonderful Wizard of Oz.

Munchkin(s) may also refer to:
Munchkin cat, a breed of cat characterized by its unusually short legs
Munchkins, a brand of doughnut hole confections sold by Dunkin' Donuts
Munchkin (company), a manufacturer of baby and toddler supplies.
"Munchkins", an episode of the television series The Americans (season 4)

Gaming
 Munchkin (card game), a card game by Steve Jackson Games
 Munchkin (role-playing games), a player who plays a non-competitive game in a competitive manner
 Munchkin (video game) or K.C. Munchkin!, a cartridge for the Philips Videopac/Magnavox Odyssey2 video game console